The Karkarduma or Karkardooma metro station is an interchange station located on both the Blue Line and the Pink Line of Delhi Metro that was opened on 6 January 2010. While the Blue Line station is at a height of 14.5 m, the Pink Line station, part of the Majilis Park-Shiv Vihar corridor of the Phase III of Delhi Metro, is the second highest station of the Delhi Metro network with a platform height of 20m from ground level.

The station is named after the Karkardooma locality in East Delhi, around its historic twin village named Karkari. The area also has the district court of Delhi, the Karkardooma District Court in Karkardooma Courts Complex built in 1997–98.

Station

Station layout

Facilities
List of available ATMs at Karkarduma metro station – Punjab National Bank, HDFC Bank, Andhra Bank, Yes Bank and IndusInd Bank.

Exits

Connections

Bus
Delhi Transport Corporation bus routes number 39A, 473, 473CL, 623A serves the station from nearby Saini Enclave bus stop.

See also

Delhi
List of Delhi Metro stations
Transport in Delhi
Delhi Metro Rail Corporation
Delhi Suburban Railway
Delhi Monorail
Anand Vihar Terminal railway station
Delhi Transport Corporation
East Delhi
New Delhi
National Capital Region (India)
List of rapid transit systems
List of metro systems

References

External links

 Delhi Metro Rail Corporation Ltd. (Official site) 
 Delhi Metro Annual Reports
 
 UrbanRail.Net – descriptions of all metro systems in the world, each with a schematic map showing all stations.

Delhi Metro stations
Railway stations opened in 2010
Railway stations in East Delhi district